Crafton may refer to:

Places
Crafton, Buckinghamshire, England
Crafton, Pennsylvania, United States
Crafton, California, United States
Crafton, Virginia, United States

Other uses
Crafton (name)